Varka Deh (also Romanized as Varkā Deh) is a village in Pain Khiyaban-e Litkuh Rural District, in the Central District of Amol County, Mazandaran Province, Iran. At the 2006 census, its population was 954, in 214 families.

References 

Populated places in Amol County